The 22171/22172 Pune - Rani Kamalapati (Habibganj) Humsafar Express is a superfast express train of the Indian Railways connecting  in Maharashtra and  (Bhopal) in Madhya Pradesh. It is currently being operated with 22171/22172 train numbers on a weekly basis.

Coach Composition 
The train is completely 3-tier AC sleeper designed by Indian Railways with features of LED screen display to show information about stations, train speed etc. and will have announcement system as well, Vending machines for tea, coffee and milk, Bio toilets in compartments as well as CCTV cameras.

Service

It averages 66 km/hr as 22171/Pune - Habibganj Humsafar Express starts on Sunday from  covering 890 km in 13 hrs 30 mins & 56 km/hr as 22172/Habibganj - Pune Humsafar Express starts on Saturday from  covering 890 km in 15 hrs 55 min.

Traction

Route & Halts

Rake Sharing
The train shares its rake with 22169/22170 Santragachi-Habibganj Humsafar Express.

Direction reversal
Train reverses its direction one time:

See also
 Santragachi - Habibganj Humsafar Express
 Humsafar Express

References

External links 
 22171/Pune - Habibganj Humsafar Express
 22172/Habibganj - Pune Humsafar Express

Humsafar Express trains
Transport in Bhopal
Transport in Pune
Rail transport in Madhya Pradesh
Rail transport in Maharashtra
Railway services introduced in 2018